Tionesta is an unincorporated community in Modoc County, California.

Tionesta has feature ID 1660004 in the U.S. Geological Survey, National Geographic Names database. The area is part of ZIP Code 96134, which includes other nearby locales such as Tulelake, Newell, and Lava Beds National Monument, and area code 530. The BNSF Railway Gateway Subdivision track runs through this area.

Tionesta is the southern gateway to Lava Beds National Monument. Nearby is the Eagle's Nest R.V. Park for motor home, trailer and tent camping. Next door is the Hawks Nest Cabins & RV Park. Tionesta also provides access to the Medicine Lakes highlands and Glass Mountain.  Numerous outdoor activities are available, including camping, hiking, exploring the area and the over 800 caves at Lava Beds. Tule Lake Segregation Center and Captain Jack's Stronghold are two of the many historical attractions also to be found in the surrounding area.

In public filings, the facility is also identified as Compressor Station Number 14B. This is a major geographic feature of the area.

History
The name, which comes from the Tionesta Forest in Pennsylvania, was bestowed by a lumber company executive.

Nearby

Politics
In the state legislature, Tionesta is in the 1st Senate District, represented by Republican Dave Cox, and in the 2nd Assembly District, represented by Republican Jim Nielsen.

References

External links
 PG&E Pipe Ranger page
 Range magazine article about a 2005 fire near Tionesta.

Unincorporated communities in California
Unincorporated communities in Modoc County, California